Thomas or Tom Terrell may refer to:

 Thomas F. Terrell (1866–1939), American politician
 Tom Terrell (baseball) (John Thomas Terrell, 1867–1893), American baseball player
 Tom Terrell (journalist) (Thomas Gerald Terrell, 1950–2007), American music journalist
 Thomas Terrell (basketball) (born 1979), American basketball player

See also
Jay Thomas (Jon Thomas Terrell, 1948–2017), American actor
T. Terrell Sessums (Thomas Terrell Sessums, 1930–2020), American politician
Terrell Brandon (Thomas Terrell Brandon, born 1970), American basketball player
Terrell Thomas (born 1985), American football player